Europa may refer to:

Places
 Europe
 Europa (Roman province), a province within the Diocese of Thrace
 Europa (Seville Metro), Seville, Spain; a station on the Seville Metro
 Europa City, Paris, France; a planned development
 Europa Cliffs, Alexander Island, Antarctica
 Europa Island, a small island in the Mozambique Channel which is a possession of France
 Europa Point, Gibraltar; the southernmost point of Gibraltar
 Europa Road, Gibraltar
 Plaça d'Europa, Barcelona, Spain; a square
 Europa, Missouri, USA; a community

Astronomical locations
 Europa (moon), a moon of Jupiter
 52 Europa, an asteroid

Buildings and structures
 Europa building, the seat of the European Council and Council of the European Union in Brussels, Belgium
 Europa Hotel (disambiguation)
 Europa Hut, a Swiss mountain hut
 Europa Tower, Vilnius, Lithuania

Fictional locations
 Europa, a fictional place in Valkyria Chronicles

People
 Europa of Macedon, the daughter of Philip II by his last wife, Cleopatra
 Madama Europa or Europa Rossi (fl. 1600), sister of Salamone Rossi

Greek mythology
 Europa (consort of Zeus), a Phoenician princess in Greek mythology, from whom the name of the continent Europe is taken
 Europa, one of the Oceanids, the daughters of the Titan Oceanus
 Europa, daughter of the earth giant Tityos and mother of Poseidon's son Euphemus the Argonaut

Businesses
 Europa (oil company), a New Zealand company purchased by British Petroleum in 1989
 EuropaCorp, a French film production company
 CBS Europa, a European television channel
 Europa Press (news agency), a Spanish news agency
 Europa Press, a 1932–1939 publishing house founded by George Reavey

Computing and technology
 Europa (web portal), a web portal of the European Union
 Europa, a line of small engines by Briggs & Stratton
 Europa, a release of Eclipse

Currency
 Europa (currency), a federal European coinage issued in 1928
 Europa Coins, coins with a common theme issued by European countries

Film 
 Europa (1931 film), a short film by Stefan Themerson and Franciszka Themerson
 Europa trilogy, a film trilogy by Lars von Trier
 Europa (1991 film), the third film in the trilogy
 Europa (2021 film), an Iraqi drama film

Literature
 Europa (novel), a 1997 novel by Tim Parks
 Europa, a 1972 novel by Romain Gary

Music
 Europa (musical duo), an electronic supergroup consisting of Jax Jones and Martin Solveig
 Europa (record label), a German record label
 Europa Philharmonie, a symphony orchestra based in Baden-Württemberg, Germany

Albums
 Europa (Covenant album), 1998
 Europa (Holly Johnson album) or the title song, 2014
 Europa (Ron Korb album) or the title song, 2013
 Europa (EP), by Diplo, 2019
 Europa (Taco Hemingway album), 2020

Songs
 "Europa (Earth's Cry Heaven's Smile)", by Carlos Santana, 1976
 "Europa", by Blondie from Autoamerican, 1980
 "Europa", by Girls' Generation from Mr.Mr., 2014
 "Europa", by Globus
 "Europa", by Mónica Naranjo from Tarántula, 2008
 "Europa", by Prozzäk from Hot Show, 1998
 "Europa", by Rosetta from The Galilean Satellites, 2005
 "Europa", by Slapp Happy and Henry Cow from Desperate Straights, 1975

Radio stations
 Europa FM (Romania)
 Europa FM (Spain)
 Europa Plus, a Russia-based group of stations operating in several countries

Sports
 CE Europa, a Spanish sports club based in Barcelona
 NFL Europa (formerly NFL Europe and World League of American Football), an American football competition from 1991 until 2007
 UEFA Europa League, the second most important European competition for UEFA-eligible football clubs
 Europa F.C., a football club based in Gibraltar

Transportation

Aerospace
 Europa (rocket), an early expendable launch system project of the European Launcher Development Organisation
 Air Europa, the third largest airline in Spain
 Europa Aircraft, a light-aircraft kitplane company based in the UK
 Europa XS, a light-aircraft kitplane made in the UK

Automobiles
 Bizzarrini Europa, a small GT car produced by Bizzarrini between 1966 and 1969
 Lotus Europa, a sports car manufactured by Lotus Cars
 Europa, a Tata Motors luxury concept car shown in 2009

Rail
 Europa (Brescia Metro), a station in Brescia, Italy
 Europa (Seville Metro), a station in Seville, Spain

Ships
 Europa (1781 EIC ship), a British East Indiaman
 Bark Europa, a Dutch tall ship, rigged as a bark (barque), built in 1911 and now used mainly for sail training
 , five ships
 SS Europa (1922) or SS Mongolia, an immigrant ship on the Europe to North America route
 SS Europa (1928), an ocean liner operated by the North German Lloyd

Military
 , six ships and a shore establishment
 USS Europa (AP-177), a troop transport
 Europa (AK-81), a US Army port repair ship (renamed Thomas F. Farrell Jr.)
 Europa Batteries, a group of artillery batteries in Gibraltar

Other uses
 Europa (wargame), a series of board wargames launched in 1973
 Europa postage stamp, issued annually since 1956, representing the founding six members of the European Coal and Steel Community
 Prix Europa, Europe's largest annual tri-medial (television, radio and online) festival and competition
 Europa (Italian newspaper)
 Europa Magazine, a Serbo-Croatian-language magazine in the United States

See also

 
 
 
 Europa Europa (1990), a film by Agnieszka Holland
 Evropa (disambiguation)
 Europe (disambiguation)